Castellar de la Muela is a municipality located in the province of Guadalajara, Castile-La Mancha, Spain.

References

Municipalities in the Province of Guadalajara